In parliamentary procedure, a friendly amendment is an amendment to a motion under debate that is perceived by all parties as an enhancement to the original motion, often only as clarification of intent. The opposite concept is known as a hostile amendment. These amendments are to be treated like other amendments.

Explanation
Friendly amendments are often allowed by the chair after consent by the original mover of the motion.  According to Robert's Rules of Order Newly Revised (RONR), a friendly amendment should not be handled any differently from any other amendment: the entire assembly must consent to the amendment, either by majority vote or through unanimous consent.

Other uses 
In Model United Nations, a "friendly amendment" is a change to a resolution that everyone is in favor of, while an "unfriendly amendment" is one that does not have everyone's support.

See also 
 Amend (motion)
 Request for permission to withdraw or modify a motion

References 

Motions (parliamentary procedure)